Typhlonectes natans, also incorrectly called the rubber eel, is a species of caecilian in the family Typhlonectidae found in Colombia, Venezuela, and possibly Trinidad and Tobago.
Its natural habitats are dry savanna, subtropical or tropical dry shrubland, subtropical or tropical moist shrubland, subtropical or tropical seasonally wet or flooded lowland grassland, and rivers. The T. natans is commonly kept as an aquarium pet, and is sometimes sold as a "fish" in aquarium stores.

A specimen of T. natans was found in October 2019 in Miami-Dade County, Florida, making it the first caecilian to be collected in North America.

They are dark grey to black in color. While T. natans can and occasionally does breathe air at the surface, most of its respiration takes place through its skin.

The species is ovoviviparous, giving birth to young in water. The gestation period lasts about 220 days. Three to seven live, fully developed young are born, which after only one year reach almost half the size of an adult.

References

natans
Amphibians of Colombia
Amphibians of Venezuela
Amphibians described in 1880
Taxonomy articles created by Polbot